Raúl Castañeda (September 20, 1982 – September 6, 2017) was a boxer from Mexico, who participated in the 2004 Summer Olympics for his native country. There he was stopped in the second round of the Light flyweight (48 kg) division by Russia's eventual bronze medalist Sergey Kazakov.

Castañeda was born in Guaymas, Sonora. He won the bronze medal in the Light flyweight division at the Pan American Games in Santo Domingo. He qualified for the Olympic Games by coming in second place at the 1st AIBA American 2004 Olympic Qualifying Tournament in Tijuana.

He was shot dead in an ambush at La Paz, Baja California Sur.

References

External links
Profile

1982 births
2017 deaths
Boxers from Sonora
People from Guaymas
Flyweight boxers
Boxers at the 2003 Pan American Games
Boxers at the 2004 Summer Olympics
Olympic boxers of Mexico
Male murder victims
Mexican male boxers
Pan American Games bronze medalists for Mexico
Pan American Games medalists in boxing
People murdered in Mexico
Mexican murder victims
Deaths by firearm in Mexico
Central American and Caribbean Games silver medalists for Mexico
Competitors at the 2002 Central American and Caribbean Games
Central American and Caribbean Games medalists in boxing
Medalists at the 2003 Pan American Games
20th-century Mexican people
21st-century Mexican people